River Runs Red is the debut studio album by American alternative metal band Life of Agony, released on October 12, 1993 by Roadrunner Records. It is a concept album, telling the story of a teenager, from a troubled household, who ultimately attempts suicide. The album features what Rolling Stone called "bleak odes to misanthropy, parental neglect, regret and killing yourself".

All music and arrangements are credited to Life of Agony collectively. All lyrics, melodies and musical concepts are credited to bassist Alan Robert. Robert also conceptualized the album's cover art and designed the band's logo. The album was produced and mixed by Josh Silver (ex-producer/keyboardist of Type O Negative) at Systems Two in Brooklyn, New York, and was mastered by George Marino at Sterling Sound, New York. River Runs Red was dedicated to Carl DeStefano.

In May 2005, River Runs Red became the fourth album overall to be inducted into the Decibel Hall of Fame. In June 2017, Rolling Stone named River Runs Red number 58 on of its list of the "100 Greatest Metal Albums of All Time".

Sound and style 
Rolling Stone noted that the tracks are "sung passionately in a unique baritone" and that they are set to "a pastiche of gloom metal and hardcore punk". The magazine also said that the band used "interpolated, hip-hop-style theatrical skits" to tell the story of a man driven to suicide. Jason Anderson of AllMusic described the album as a "unique combination of New York hardcore, metal, and a touch of spooky grunge vaguely reminiscent of Alice in Chains. Anderson said "This Time" and "Underground" were the album's grungiest tracks, while "Method of Groove" was "reckless hardcore".

Concept 
River Runs Red is a concept album that focuses on suicide, while also exploring themes of abuse, alcoholism, and abandonment.

Story 
The lyrics of the musical tracks on "River Runs Red" do not directly correlate with the story but do touch on personal issues facing various band members and at the same time they provide a feel in-line with the story being told in the theatrical tracks. For example, the album's first theatrical track, "Monday", establishes that the main character's mother (possibly step-mother) is verbally abusive and neglects her infant child. The track ends with the main character listening to a voicemail in which his girlfriend breaks up with him. The next musical song is the title track, "River Runs Red" which include lyrics about contemplating suicide, "I got the razor at my wrist". On "Thursday" the main character enters his home and is once again berated by his mother. The track ends with him being fired from his job and being notified that he is failing two classes and won't be able to graduate high school. Two tracks later, the song "My Eyes", includes lyrics about giving up on life completely, "Just give me one good reason to live, I'll give you three to die". The album closes with the track "Friday". The main character comes home and endures the worst insults yet from his mother. She then instigates a fight with the father, who engages her in a screaming match. As the teen heads upstairs, the parents continue to argue and the sound of plates shattering is heard in the distance. The main character locks himself in the bathroom and breaks the fourth wall by turning on a radio that begins playing River Runs Red. The mother yells at the teenager through the door as he begins running bath water. The young man's breath becomes shaky as he slits his wrist. The sound of blood can be heard dripping into the water. The mother breaks into the bathroom and screams in horror at what she sees. The album ends with the mother's screams fading as the sound of his blood dripping into water increases.

Releases and reissues

River Runs Red – Digipak Edition 

In 1994, Roadrunner Records re-issued River Runs Red in a limited, 3-fold digipak. In addition to the standard album, this release included four bonus live tracks recorded at The Stone Pony in Asbury Park, New Jersey on February 25, 1994. Three of these tracks are live renditions of songs featured on River Runs Red.  However, the studio version of "Plexi Intro" is not found on the album. The original version, entitled "Plexiglass Gate", was recorded during pre-production of River Runs Red in August of 1992. The track was later released on the 1993 compilation album, East Coast Assault released by Too Damn Hype Records. The song received significant airplay on popular, NYC area, college radio station, WSOU, which helped introduce the band to a larger audience just prior to the release of River Runs Red.

River Runs Red – The Top Shelf Edition 

On April 29, 2008, Roadrunner Records issued a limited, two-disc CD/DVD titled River Runs Red – The Top Shelf Edition. This quad-fold, slipcase digipak featured a CD containing the original album remastered for the first time since its initial release over 15 years earlier. Ted Jensen remastered the album at Sterling Sound, New York City in June 2006. The remastered CD also included four previously released bonus tracks. The first two bonus tracks, "Here I Am, Here I Stay" and "Depression", were recorded in May of 1991 and originally appeared on Life of Agony's fourth demo, The Stain Remains. The remaining two bonus tracks, "3 Companions" and the aforementioned, "Plexiglass Gate", were taken from River Runs Red pre-production/writing sessions in August of 1992. The bonus tracks were remixed in September 1999 by Alan Robert and Michael Marciano at Systems Two recording studios in Brooklyn, New York. Additionally, the set included a DVD featuring the music videos for "Through and Through" and "This Time", as well as two live performances from the Dynamo Open Air Festival in 1995. The extended liner notes included an exclusive new interview with the band and producer/mixer, Josh Silver, on the making of the album. River Runs Red – The Top Shelf Edition remains the only CD release to feature the original album in remastered form.

20 Years Strong – River Runs Red: Live in Brussels 

On October 7, 2009, it was announced that the band would perform the album in its entirety, for the first time ever, at the Starland Ballroom in Sayreville, New Jersey on November 28, 2009. This would become the first date of a US tour, followed by a European tour on which the band would perform the complete album, top to bottom, at every show. The performance at the Ancienne Belgique in Brussels, Belgium on April 3, 2010 was filmed and recorded for a CD/DVD package entitled "20 Years Strong – River Runs Red: Live in Brussels", which was published later that same year.

Sequel: The Sound of Scars 
October 11, 2019, almost exactly 26 years after the release of River Runs Red, Life of Agony released the sequel, The Sound of Scars, on Napalm Records. It was Life of Agony's second concept album and the only sequel to the story told on River Runs Red.

The album starts off with the theatrical track, "Prelude", the track begins with the same sound of blood dripping into water that closed River Runs Red. In "Prelude", the listener learns that the young man from River Runs Red has survived his suicide attempt. The story then jumps 26 years forward, with the man now married and attempting to cope with the "scars" of his past.

Since its release, The Sound Of Scars has received a positive critical response. Dom Lawson of Blabbermouth.net said the sequel was "a welcome display of class and power from some perennially unsung champions." Jon Hadusek of Consequence of Sound praised the storyline and called the album, "a worthy successor to River Runs Red."

Reception 

In 2017, Rolling Stone named River Runs Red the 58th-greatest metal album of all time. In May 2005, River Runs Red was inducted into the Decibel Magazine Hall of Fame, being the fourth album overall to be featured there.

Jason Anderson of AllMusic gave River Runs Red a highly positive review, saying the album was "passionate, serious, and heavy" and that it was "one of the early '90s' better metal debuts." However, Anderson said Caputo's vocals were underdeveloped, but also said the delivery was unique and passionate.

In 2013, the vinyl edition of the album peaked at number 11 on the Billboard Vinyl Albums chart.

Track listing

Credits 
Life of Agony:
 Keith Caputo – lead vocals, keyboards
 Joey Z – guitar, backing vocals, co-lead vocals on "Method of Groove"
 Alan Robert – bass, backing vocals, co-lead vocals on "Method of Groove", cover design
 Sal Abruscato – drums

Additional:
 Josh Silver – producer
 Joe Marciano – engineer
 Ed Reed – engineer
 George Marino – mastering
 Linda Aversa – photography
 Al Bello – photography
 John Richard – photography

River Runs Red – The Top Shelf Edition (2008) credits:
 Produced for reissue by Monte Connor
 Remastered by Ted Jenson at Sterling Sound, NYC – June 2006
 Project coordinator: Steven Hartong
 DVD authored by Bionic Mastering
 Liner notes by J. Bennet
 Design by Mr. Scott Design
 Additional photos by Linda Aversa, Dirk Zumpe and Chris Toliver
 Bonus tracks taken from the 1999 Life of Agony compilation album 1989–1999

References 

1993 debut albums
Concept albums
Life of Agony albums
Roadrunner Records albums